Ulla-Lena Lundberg (born 14 July 1947, Kökar, Åland) is a Finland-Swedish author living in Porvoo, Finland. Her Swedish-language books have been translated into several languages, including Finnish, Danish, German, Russian and Dutch.

Biography
Lundberg made her debut at age 15 with the poetry anthology  in 1962. In 1964, she spent some time in the United States on a scholarship. She subsequently wrote of her experiences in the US. Lundberg also wrote a book about Japan after living there in 1968.

Her breakthrough is generally considered to be the 1976 book , a factual account of the past and present of her island of birth, told through the stories of some of the islanders.

After obtaining her Master's degree in 1985 from Åbo Akademi University, Lundberg spent the academic year of 1986–1987 as a lecturer and writer in residence at the University of Minnesota. Save for this one year at the University of Minnesota, Lundberg has worked her entire professional life as an author and continues to do so.

In 1993, Lundberg published , which, in addition to being an autobiography, is an account of four-month-long stays in Siberia. This has been the most internationally successful of her books.

She has received numerous awards for her writing, including Runebergspriset and the prize for Finnish authors awarded by the Swedish Academy. In 1993, Lundberg was awarded an honorary doctorate of arts by Åbo Akademi University. Between 1994 and 1999, Lundberg held the title Professor of Arts. She has been nominated three times for Finland's top literary award the Finlandia Prize, and in 2012 she won the prize with the Swedish-language novel .

Lundberg is featured on a stamp issued on 21 March 2009 by Åland Post, the postal authority of Åland.  The stamp, by the artist , is a portrait of Lundberg next to a depiction of the ship Leo, from the first book of her trilogy about Åland shipping.  The stamp is part of a stamp booklet called Åland Authors, and also includes a stamp featuring Anni Blomqvist and a stamp featuring .

Lundberg's novel Ice was awarded the Finlandia Prize, Finland's most prestigious literary award, in 2012. With domestic sales of almost 150,000 copies, it has become one of the most cherished Finnish novels of the decade. Partly based on the life on Lundberg's own family on the isolated island of Kökar, Ice has attracted much interest from theatres, but the Finnish National Opera was the first to get permission to adapt it for the stage. The libretto follows the key events and characters of the rich novel, with music that rings with the changing seasons and the ever-present threat of ice.

Bibliography

As author
  (1962) (poetry)
  (1966) (travel)
  (1968) (travel)
  (1970) (travel)
  (1974) (radio theater)
  (1976) (factual)
  (1977) (novella anthology)
  (1981) (anthropology)
  (1982) (novel)
  (1984) (novel)
  (1985) (master's thesis)
  (1986) (novel)
  (1989) (novel)
  (1991) (novel)
  (1993) (travel)
  (1995) (novel)
  (1997) (novel)
  (2001) (novel)
  (2005) (biography of Åke Hellman, co-authored by Erik Kruskopf)
  (2006) (history of a Gammelgård's social club in Espoo, co-authored by Lasse Hoffman and Unni Malmgren)
  (2012) (novel)

As editor
  (1981) (autobiography of Algot Lundberg)
  (2000)

References

External links
 
  Biography of Ulla-Lena Lundberg, Library of Mariehamn, Åland
  Complete bibliography of Lundberg, Library of Mariehamn, Åland
  Interview with Ulla-Lena Lundberg, Dec. 2007
  Interview with Ulla-Lena Lundberg
  Entry for Lundberg on the website of Finnish publisher Gummerus
  Åland Post autumn 2008 stamp information pdf leaflet pages 16 to 20 about the Åland Authors booklet

1947 births
Living people
People from Kökar
Writers from Åland
Finnish writers in Swedish
Finnish women writers
Swedish women writers
Åbo Akademi University alumni
University of Minnesota faculty
Swedish-speaking Finns